Mercy Adoma Owusu-Nimoh (6 February 1936 – 14 February 2011) was a Ghanaian children's writer, publisher, educationist and politician. She was the recipient of a Noma Award honourable mention in 1980 for The Walking Calabash.

Mercy Adoma Owusu Nimoh was a Ghanaian author and also the founder-proprietor of Ama Nipaa Memorial Preparatory and Junior Secondary School in Kade, Ghana. In the 1996 parliamentary elections she stood as the National Democratic Congress (NDC) candidate in Kade, coming second with 37.9% of the vote.

Works
Rivers of Ghana, 1979
Kofizee Goes to School, 1978
The Walking Calabash and Other Stories, 1977
Mosquito Town, 1966

References

Ghanaian children's writers
Living people
1936 births
Ghanaian women writers
Ghanaian women children's writers
20th-century Ghanaian women writers
21st-century Ghanaian women writers